Fairfield Airport  is a public airport located one mile (2 km) north of the central business district of Fairfield, in Teton County, Montana, United States. It is owned by the City of Fairfield and Teton County.

Facilities and aircraft 
For the 12-month period ending August 22, 2008, the airport had 3,850 aircraft operations, an average of 10 per day: 97% general aviation and 3% air taxi.

References

External links 
 

Airports in Montana
Buildings and structures in Teton County, Montana
Transportation in Teton County, Montana